Control Freek is the second solo studio album by American rapper Tash. It was released on June 30, 2009 via Amalgam Digital. Production was handled by E-Swift, J Beam, Affion Crockett, Da Truth, Emmaculate, E Sharp, Josh G, J. Wells, Maestro, Montage One, Oh No, Thayod Ausar and Tony Touch. It features guest appearances from Tha Alkaholiks, Knoc-turn'al, Fameus, King T, Ali Jammali, B-Real, Del the Funky Homosapien, Khujo, Kokane, Mathmadix, Montageone, O Sin, Samuel Christian and Styliztik Jones.

Track listing

References

External link

2009 albums
Tash (rapper) albums
Amalgam Digital albums
Albums produced by Oh No (musician)